Dotson Ridge is a ridgelike nunatak, 1.5 nautical miles (3 km) long, rising to  in the northwest part of Flight Deck Neve, Convoy Range. It was mapped by the United States Geological Survey from ground surveys and Navy air photos, and was named by the Advisory Committee on Antarctic Names in 1964 for Morris F. Dotson, an electrician at McMurdo Station, 1962.

References 

Nunataks of Victoria Land
Scott Coast